Dermot MacCarthy (1310–1367) was the 1st Lord of Muskerry. He was an Irish magnate who owned extensive lands in central Munster. He was the first of the long line of the MacCarthy of Muskerry dynasty.

Birth and origins 
Dermot was born in 1310 or 1340, second son of Cormac MacCarthy Mor, King of Desmond.

Children 
MacCarthy had at least three sons:
 Cormac (d. 1374), 2nd Lord of Muskerry
 Felim
 Donough

Later life and death 
MacCarthy was granted the Muskerry area as appanage in 1353 and received the English title Lord of Muskerry.

He died a violent death in 1367, 1368 or 1381, killed by the O'Mahonys or by his uncle Fitzmaurice. He died in 1381 or in 1367, killed by the O'Mahonys. Otherwise, he was killed by his maternal uncle Lord Fitzmaurice in 1368. He is the founder of the MacCarthy of Muskerry dynasty. He was probably succeeded by his eldest son Cormac as the 2nd Lord. His grandson Teige was the 6th Lord, but the 3rd, 4th and 5th lords are not known by name and might have succeeded by primogeniture or might have been chosen by tanistry.

Notes, citations, and sources

Notes

Citations

Sources 
 
 
 
 
  – Irish stem

1310 births
1367 deaths
MacCarthy dynasty